Konolfingen District was a district in the canton of Bern, Switzerland. The district capital was the municipality of Konolfingen. The district consisted of 29 municipalities in an area of 214 km².
CH-3112 Allmendingen bei Bern
CH-3508 Arni bei Biglen
CH-3507 Biglen
CH-3674 Bleiken bei Oberdiessbach
CH-3533 Bowil
CH-3671 Brenzikofen
CH-3510 Freimettigen
CH-3506 Grosshöchstetten
CH-3510 Häutligen
CH-3671 Herbligen
CH-3629 Kiesen
CH-3510 Konolfingen
CH-3434 Landiswil
CH-3673 Linden BE
CH-3532 Mirchel
CH-3110 Münsingen
CH-3504 Niederhünigen
CH-3672 Oberdiessbach
CH-3504 Oberhünigen
CH-3531 Oberthal
CH-3629 Oppligen
CH-3113 Rubigen
CH-3082 Schlosswil
CH-3502 Tägertschi
CH-3083 Trimstein
CH-3512 Walkringen
CH-3114 Wichtrach
CH-3076 Worb
CH-3532 Zäziwil

Mergers
On 1 January 2010 the municipality of Aeschlen merged into the municipality of Oberdiessbach.

References

Former districts of the canton of Bern